Love to Love You Baby may refer to:

 Love to Love You Baby (album), the second studio album by Donna Summer
 "Love to Love You Baby" (song), a 1975 Donna Summer song from the album of the same name